Smith Square is a square in Westminster, London, 250 metres south-southwest of the Palace of Westminster. Most of its garden interior is filled by St John's, Smith Square, a Baroque surplus church, the inside of which has been converted to a concert hall. Most adjoining buildings (thus sharing its address) are offices, with the focus on organisations lobbying or serving the government. In the mid-20th century, the square hosted the headquarters of the two largest parties of British politics, and it is now hosts much of the Department for Environment, Food and Rural Affairs and the Local Government Association.  It has a pedestrian or mixed approach to the four sides and another approach to the north.

History
The square was named after the Smith family: a family of bankers originally from Nottingham on whose land it was developed in the early eighteenth century. Its building up was arranged by Sir James Smith around 1726. №s 1 to 9, forming the north side, survive from this phase.

Buildings

Sir John Smith, who was Conservative M.P. for Cities of London and Westminster from 1965 to 1970, lived at № 1.
The campaigning journalist William Thomas Stead lived at № 5 from 1904 until his death on board the Titanic in 1912. Another famous resident was Rab Butler, the Conservative Deputy Prime Minister.

№ 17 - Nobel House - cross-corner block built in 1928, for newly-formed Imperial Chemical Industries (ICI). ICI leased it to the government in 1987, and it is currently headquarters for the Department for Environment, Food and Rural Affairs.

Sharing the western part of the south side is Transport House which from 1928 to 1980 head-quartered the Labour Party then the TGWU until the 1990s. It is now the headquarters of the Local Government Association and is known as Local Government House.

№s 32-34 served as Conservative Central Office, the Conservative Party's headquarters between 1958 and 2003. It stood empty until 2007 when it was sold for £30.5m to Harcourt Developments who planned to redevelop it as flats before the 2008 credit crunch hit. It is now "Europe House".

See also
 List of eponymous roads in London
 Imperial Chemical House
 Lord North Street – one of two northern approaches to Great Peter Street
 Victoria Tower Gardens – the eastern approach

References

External links
 

Squares in the City of Westminster